Léon Dion  (9 October 1922 – 20 August 1997) was a Canadian political scientist.

Dion was born in Saint-Arsène, Rivière-du-Loup Regional County Municipality.  He founded the department of political science at Université Laval with Gérard Bergeron and Maurice Tremblay in 1954.

He is the father of former federal foreign affairs minister and former Liberal leader Stéphane Dion.

Honours
1965 - Prize of the Académie française, Les groupes et le pouvoir politique aux États-Unis (Groups and power in the United States)
1970 - Member of the Royal Society of Canada
1971 - Doctorat honoris causa of laws from Queen's University
1972 - Member of the Académie des sciences morales et politiques
1977 - Prix Léon-Gérin
1983 - Prix Arthur-Buies, given during the Salon du livre à Rimouski
1985 - Prix Esdras-Minville
1986 - Médaille Gloire de l'Escolle
1990 - Prix Marcel-Vincent
1990 - Officer of the National Order of Quebec
1993 - Governor General's Award finalist
1996 - Officer of the Order of Canada

External links
 Biography, from the Prix du Québec

Canadian political scientists
Officers of the Order of Canada
Officers of the National Order of Quebec
Members of the Académie des sciences morales et politiques
1922 births
1997 deaths
Academic staff of Université Laval
Presidents of the Canadian Political Science Association
20th-century political scientists